Orso I Participazio (Latin: Ursus Particiacus; died 881), also known as Orso I Badoer, was Doge of Venice from 864 until 881. He was, according to tradition, the fourteenth doge, though historically he is only the twelfth.

History
He was elected, probably by acclamation, after several days of street fighting that followed the assassination of his predecessor, Pietro Tradonico, on 13 September 864. Those responsible, numbering around eight, were later arrested and punished accordingly: some were executed, others condemned to exile in France and Constantinople. 

Orso's most significant accomplishment was his reform of Venetian government. Until his tenure, the practical power of the Doge had been unlimited; the authority of the tribunes, whose role was to check the Doge's power, had declined; and it had become the practice of the Doge to co-opt his son or brother as his fellow Doge, thus introducing a hereditary tendency to the office. Orso instituted elected judges who would serve as magistrates as well as counsellors to the Doge. Orso also reorganized the ecclesiastical structure of the islands of Venice by securing the creation of five new bishoprics, thus thwarting the domination of the Patriarch of Aquileia and the Patriarch of Grado.

Orso, like Tradonico, continued the fight against the Slavic and Saracen pirates, who inhabited the Adriatic. He was aided by newly constructed larger ships. 

Orso presented to Byzantine Emperor Basil I a bell for the basilica Hagia Sophia.  

He had six children with a wife whose identity is unknown. According to the Chronicon Venetum they were Giovanni, Badoario, Orso, Pietro, Felicia and Giovanna. The eldest, Giovanni, served for some time as his father's co-regent, and was elected Doge following his death in 881.

Sources

Norwich, John Julius. A History of Venice. Alfred A. Knopf: New York, 1982. 

Year of birth missing
881 deaths
9th-century Doges of Venice
Orso